The 1998 Harrogate Council election took place on 7 May 1998 to elect members of Harrogate Borough Council in North Yorkshire, England. One third of the council was up for election and the Liberal Democrats stayed in overall control of the council.

After the election, the composition of the council was:
Liberal Democrat 40
Conservative 14
Labour 4
Independent 1

Election result

Ward results

References

1998
1998 English local elections
1990s in North Yorkshire